Mohammad Sarwar Afridi (born 20 January 1995) is a Pakistani cricketer who plays for Khyber Pakhtunkhwa. He made his first-class debut on 26 October 2015 in the 2015–16 Quaid-e-Azam Trophy. He made his List A debut for Federally Administered Tribal Areas in the 2017–18 Regional One Day Cup on 4 February 2018.

References

External links
 
 Mohammad Sarwar Afridi at Pakistan Cricket Board

1995 births
Living people
Pashtun people
Afridi people
Pakistani cricketers
Federally Administered Tribal Areas cricketers
Cricketers from Peshawar